Polyene antimycotics, sometimes referred to as polyene antibiotics, are a class of antimicrobial polyene compounds that target fungi. These polyene antimycotics are typically obtained from some species of Streptomyces bacteria.  Previously, polyenes were thought to bind to ergosterol in the fungal cell membrane and thus weakening it and causing leakage of K+ and Na+ ions, which could contribute to fungal cell death. However, more detailed studies of polyene molecular properties have challenged this model suggesting that polyenes instead bind and extract ergosterol directly from the cellular membrane thus disrupting the many cellular functions ergosterols perform. Amphotericin B, nystatin, and natamycin are examples of polyene antimycotics. They are a subgroup of macrolides.

Structures
Their chemical structures feature a large ring of atoms (in essence, a cyclic ester ring) containing multiple conjugated carbon-carbon double bonds (hence polyene) on one side of the ring and multiple hydroxyl groups bonded to the other side of the ring. Their structures also often have a D-mycosamine (a type of amino-glycoside) group bonded to the molecule. The series of conjugated double bonds typically absorbs strongly in the ultraviolet-visible region of the electromagnetic spectrum, often resulting in the polyene antibiotics having a yellow color.

Biosynthesis
The natural route to synthesis includes polyketide synthase components.

Other examples of polyenes
 Rimocidin
 Filipin
 Candicin
 Hamycin
 Perimycin
 Dermostatin

References

Antifungals
Macrolides
Polyenes